Yes, Friends and Relatives is a compilation album featuring songs of progressive rock band Yes and a selection of performances licensed from associated acts. The double CD was released in 1998. The album opens with a 1998 Jon Anderson remake of "Owner of a Lonely Heart". Yes only actually feature on two tracks, the closing track on each disc: live versions of "Close to the Edge" on disc 1 and "America" on disc 2.

Track listing

References

Albums with cover art by Roger Dean (artist)
Yes (band) compilation albums
1998 compilation albums